Carlos Castillo may refer to:
 Carlos Castillo Armas (1914–1957), president of Guatemala
 Carlos Castillo Peraza (1947–2000), Mexican journalist and politician
 Carlos Castillo Mattasoglio (born 1950), Peruvian Catholic bishop
 Carlos Castillo (baseball) (born 1975), American retired baseball player
 Carlos Castillo (Colombian footballer) (born 1975)
 Carlos Castillo (Guatemalan footballer) (born 1977)

See also
 Carlos Castillo-Chavez (born 1951 or 1952), American mathematician